In metaphysics, a universal is what particular things have in common, namely characteristics or qualities. In other words, universals are repeatable or recurrent entities that can be instantiated or exemplified by many particular things. For example, suppose there are two chairs in a room, each of which is green. These two chairs both share the quality of "chairness", as well as greenness or the quality of being green; in other words, they share a "universal". There are three major kinds of qualities or characteristics: types or kinds (e.g. mammal), properties (e.g. short, strong), and relations (e.g. father of, next to). These are all different types of universals.

Paradigmatically, universals are abstract (e.g. humanity), whereas particulars are concrete (e.g. the personhood of Socrates). However, universals are not necessarily abstract and particulars are not necessarily concrete. For example, one might hold that numbers are particular yet abstract objects.  Likewise, some philosophers, such as D. M. Armstrong, consider universals to be concrete.

Most do not consider classes to be universals, although some prominent philosophers do, such as John Bigelow.

Qualification of universals 
The history of any creation went through a process of qualifications meeting dependancies of that type thing, including all parts put together to make it an accepted thing of its particular type. A chair must first exist upon a surface with the force of gravity upon it. The chair must be upon something solid and it must provide a platform for something to sit upon. Any other universals for “chairness” must qualify the particular dependencies set forth by authority. The first chair qualified itself as a chair from its propriety. Universals exist in every created thing, but only in the individual subparts themselves, not in the whole thing itself. Universals can be thought of as an evolution of a creation’s life constantly on a journey towards perfection.

Problem of universals

The problem of universals is an ancient problem in metaphysics about whether universals exist. The problem arises from attempts to account for the phenomenon of similarity or attribute agreement among things. For example, grass and Granny Smith apples are similar or agree in attribute, namely in having the attribute of greenness. The issue is how to account for this sort of agreement in attribute among things.

There are many philosophical positions regarding universals. Taking "beauty" as an example, four positions are:
 Idealism: beauty is a property constructed in the mind, so it exists only in descriptions of things.
 Platonic extreme realism: beauty is a property that exists in an ideal form independently of any mind or thing.
 Aristotelian moderate realism or conceptualism: beauty is a property of things (fundamentum in re) that the mind abstracts from these beautiful things.
 Nominalism: there are no universals, only individuals.

Taking a broader view, the main positions are generally considered classifiable as: extreme realism, nominalism (sometimes simply named "anti-realism" with regard to universals), moderate realism, and idealism. Extreme Realists posit the existence of independent, abstract universals to account for attribute agreement. Nominalists deny that universals exist, claiming that they are not necessary to explain attribute agreement. Conceptualists posit that universals exist only in the mind, or when conceptualized, denying the independent existence of universals, but accepting they have a fundamentum in re. 
Complications which arise include the implications of language use and the complexity of relating language to ontology.

Particular

A universal may have instances, known as its particulars. For example, the type dog (or doghood) is a universal, as are the property red (or redness) and the relation betweenness (or being between). Any particular dog, red thing, or object that is between other things is not a universal, however, but is an instance of a universal. That is, a universal type (doghood), property (redness), or relation (betweenness) inheres in a particular object (a specific dog, red thing, or object between other things).

Platonic realism
Platonic realism holds universals to be the referents of general terms, such as the abstract, nonphysical, non-mental entities to which words such as "sameness", "circularity", and "beauty" refer. Particulars are the referents of proper names, such as "Phaedo," or of definite descriptions that identify single objects, such as the phrase, "that hoe over there". Other metaphysical theories may use the terminology of universals to describe physical entities.

Plato's examples of what we might today call universals included mathematical and geometrical ideas such as a circle and natural numbers as universals.  Plato's views on universals did, however, vary across several different discussions. In some cases, Plato spoke as if the perfect circle functioned as the form or blueprint for all copies and for the word definition of circle. In other discussions, Plato describes particulars as "participating" in the associated universal.

Contemporary realists agree with the thesis that universals are multiply-exemplifiable entities. Examples include by D. M. Armstrong, Nicholas Wolterstorff, Reinhardt Grossmann, Michael Loux.

Nominalism
Nominalists hold that universals are not real mind-independent entities but either merely concepts (sometimes called "conceptualism") or merely names. Nominalists typically argue that properties are abstract particulars (like tropes) rather than universals. JP Moreland distinguishes between "extreme" and "moderate" nominalism. Examples of nominalists include the medieval philosophers Roscelin of Compiègne and William of Ockham and contemporary philosophers W. V. O. Quine, Wilfred Sellars, D. C. Williams, and Keith Campbell.

Ness-ity-hood principle 
The ness-ity-hood principle is used mainly by English-speaking philosophers to generate convenient, concise names for universals or properties.  According to the Ness-Ity-Hood Principle, a name for any universal may be formed by taking the name of the predicate and adding the suffix "ness", "ity", or "hood". For example, the universal that is distinctive of left-handers may be formed by taking the predicate "left-handed" and adding "ness", which yields the name "left-handedness".  The principle is most helpful in cases where there is not an established or standard name of the universal in ordinary English usage:  What is the name of the universal distinctive of chairs?  "Chair" in English is used not only as a subject (as in "The chair is broken"), but also as a predicate (as in "That is a chair").  So to generate a name for the universal distinctive of chairs, take the predicate "chair" and add "ness", which yields "chairness".

See also

 Hypostatic abstraction
 Philosophy of mathematics
 Sortal
 Transcendental nominalism
 The Secret of Hegel
 Universality (philosophy)
 Universalism

Notes

References
 Feldman, Fred (2005). "The Open Question Argument: What It Isn't; and What It Is", Philosophical Issues 15, Normativity. 
 Loux, Michael J. (1998). Metaphysics: A Contemporary Introduction, N.Y.: Routledge.
 Loux, Michael J. (2001). "The Problem of Universals" in Metaphysics: Contemporary Readings, Michael J. Loux (ed.), N.Y.: Routledge, pp. 3–13.
 MacLeod, M. & Rubenstein, E. (2006). "Universals", The Internet Encyclopedia of Philosophy, J. Fieser & B. Dowden (eds.). (link)
 Moreland, J. P. (2001). Universals, McGill-Queen's University Press/Acumen.
 Price, H. H. (1953). "Universals and Resemblance", Ch. 1 of Thinking and Experience, Hutchinson's University Library.
 Rodriguez-Pereyra, Gonzalo (2008). "Nominalism in Metaphysics", The Stanford Encyclopedia of Philosophy, Edward N. Zalta (ed.). (link)

Further reading
 Aristotle, Categories (link)
 Aristotle, Metaphysics (link)
 Armstrong, D. M. (1989). Universals: An Opinionated Introduction, Westview Press. (link)
 Bolton, M., “Universals, Essences, and Abstract Entities”, in: D. Garber, M. Ayers, red., The Cambridge History of Seventeenth-Century Philosophy (Cambridge: Cambridge University Press, 1998), vol. I, pp. 178–211
 Libera, Alain de (2005), Der Universalienstreit. Von Platon bis zum Ende des Mittelalters, München, Wilhelm Fink Verlag, 2005
 Plato, Phaedo (link)
 Plato, Republic (esp. books V, VI, VII and X) (link)
 Plato, Parmenides (link)
 Plato, Sophist (link)
 Quine, W. V. O. (1961). "On What There is," in From a Logical Point of View, 2nd/ed. N.Y: Harper and Row.
 Russell, Bertrand (1912). "The World of Universals," in The Problems of Philosophy, Oxford University Press.
 Russell, Bertrand (1912b). "On the Relation of Universals and Particulars" (link)
 Swoyer, Chris (2000). "Properties", The Stanford Encyclopedia of Philosophy, Edward N. Zalta (ed.). (link)
 Williams, D. C. (1953). "On the Elements of Being", Review of Metaphysics, vol. 17. (link)

External links
 Chrysippus – Stanford Encyclopedia of Philosophy
 Chrysippus – Internet Encyclopedia of Philosophy

Concepts in aesthetics
Concepts in epistemology
Concepts in metaphilosophy
Concepts in metaphysics
Concepts in the philosophy of mind
Concepts in the philosophy of science
Metaphysical theories
Ontology